K26GS-D, virtual and UHF digital channel 26, branded on-air as KGS 26, is a low-powered H&I-affiliated television station licensed to Harrison, Arkansas, serving the North Central Arkansas-Ozarks region. The station is owned by Reynolds Media.

K26GS is relayed on translator station K07XL-D (channel 7) in Mountain Home.

Digital channels
The station's signal is multiplexed:

Translator

References

External links 
HometownTV.net - official website

This TV affiliates
True Crime Network affiliates
TheGrio affiliates
MeTV affiliates
Comet (TV network) affiliates
Charge! (TV network) affiliates
Television channels and stations established in 2002
2002 establishments in Arkansas
Low-power television stations in the United States
26GS-D
Harrison, Arkansas